Windell Dwain Middlebrooks, Jr. (January 8, 1979 – March 9, 2015) was an American actor and singer. Most famous as a TV pitchman for Miller High Life beer, Middlebrooks also starred in The Suite Life on Deck and Body of Proof.

Early life
Middlebrooks was born January 8, 1979, in Fort Worth, Texas He was an alumnus of Sterling College in Sterling, Kansas, where he earned a Bachelor's degree in Theatre/Communications, the Los Angeles Film Studies Center, and University of California, Irvine, where he earned a Master of Fine Arts in acting in 2004.

Career
For one season, he worked at the famed Texas Musical Drama, near Canyon, Texas.  He started as a hospitality employee, yet he would go on to have a successful acting career on the stage and screen. Middlebrooks worked on The Suite Life on Deck, Hannah Montana, My Name is Earl, and Chocolate News. He is best known for his Miller High Life beer ads, playing a deliveryman who, if he considers the situation to be adverse to "the high life" (such as an expensive restaurant or a skybox at a baseball game), will confiscate all the Miller High Life from the location. He appeared in HBO's Entourage and portrayed a recurring character in the ninth season of Scrubs.

Middlebrooks was a guest on Adam Carolla's podcast on April 2, 2009. He also appeared on It's Always Sunny in Philadelphia as a character who marries a transgender ex-love of Mac and has a child with her, of which Dee is the surrogate mother.  He appeared as a regular cast member in the medical/procedural drama television series Body of Proof, playing an assistant coroner.  The show premiered on ABC in March 2011 and ended in May 2013.

Personal life
Middlebrooks was awarded the Chancellor's Club Fellowship at University of California, Irvine.

Middlebrooks was a Christian.

Death
On March 9, 2015, Middlebrooks was found unconscious at his home in the San Fernando Valley, pronounced dead on arrival at a Los Angeles hospital. An autopsy revealed that he suffered a fatal pulmonary embolism. One or more arteries in his lungs had become blocked by a blood clot. Middlebrooks was 36 years old at his death.

Filmography

References

External links
 

1979 births
2015 deaths
21st-century American male actors
American male television actors
American male film actors
African-American Christians
African-American male actors
Male actors from Fort Worth, Texas
University of California, Irvine alumni
Sterling College alumni
Deaths from pulmonary embolism
21st-century African-American people
20th-century African-American people